Ventresca is a surname, 
ventresca is from ventre, the Italian word for belly.

Surname 
Notable people with the surname include:
Carla Ventresca, co-creator with her husband Henry Beckett of the comic strip On A Claire Day
Vincent Ventresca (born 1966) American actor

Food 
Ventresca tuna (from ventre, the Italian word for belly), is a luxury canned tuna, from the fatty bluefin tuna belly, also used in sushi as toro.
 Ventresca, from ventre, refers to the Italian word for belly, refers to bacon
 Ventresca, from ventre, refers to the Italian word for belly, refers to pancetta